Alan David may refer to:

Alan David (actor), British actor appeared from 1974 to 1977 in The Squirrels
Alan David (singer), British pop singer, appeared on Gadzooks! from 1965

See also